The UP Summit is a German single-place paraglider, designed and produced by UP Europe of Kochel am See, now UP International of Garmisch-Partenkirchen. Introduced in 2001, production continued through 2016 with the Summit XC4 model.

Design and development
The Summit was designed as a performance intermediate cross country glider.

The design has progressed through several generations of models, the Summit, Summit 2, Summit 3, Summit XC, Summit XC2 and Summit XC4. The models are each named for their relative size.

The Summit 3 was a whole new design, based upon the UP Trango 2 and Targa 2 wing designs.

The original model Summit's sail was made from Porsher Marine New Skytex and its lines were fabricated from Cousin Trestec Super Aramid.

The Summit XC4's sail top surface is made from Porcher Skytex 38 Universal, while the bottom surface is Domenica 30DMF. The wing's cell walls are Porcher Skytex 40 Hard. The gallery lines are made from Edelrid 8000U-130/090/070/050 (Aramid unsheathed), the middle lines are made from Edelrid 8000U-200/130/090 (Aramid unsheathed)/Liros DC200 (Dyneema unsheathed), the main lines are Liros DC300/DC200 (Dyneema unsheathed), Edelrid 8000U-230  (Aramid unsheathed), while the brake lines are Cousin 989-1,5 (Dyneema unsheathed)/ Edelrid 8000U-090/050 (Aramid unsheathed).

Variants

Summit
Produced from 2001-2002.
Summit S
Small-sized model for lighter pilots. The glider model is Deutscher Hängegleiterverband e.V. (DHV) 2 certified.
Summit M
Mid-sized model for medium-weight pilots. The glider model is DHV 2 certified.
Summit L
Large-sized model for heavier pilots. The glider model is DHV 2 certified.

Summit 2
Produced from 2003-2005.
Summit 2 XS
Extra small-sized model for lighter pilots. The glider model is DHV 2 certified.
Summit 2 S
Small-sized model for lighter pilots. The glider model is DHV 2 certified.
Summit 2 M
Mid-sized model for medium-weight pilots. The glider model is DHV 2 certified.
Summit 2 L
Large-sized model for heavier pilots. The glider model is DHV 2 certified.

Summit 3
Produced from 2006-2007.
Summit 3 XS
Extra small-sized model for lighter pilots. The glider model is DHV 2 certified.
Summit 3 S
Small-sized model for lighter pilots. The glider model is DHV 2 certified.
Summit 3 SM
Small medium-sized model for mid-weight pilots. The glider model is DHV 2 certified.
Summit 3 M
Mid-sized model for medium-weight pilots. The glider model is DHV 2 certified.
Summit 3 L
Large-sized model for heavier pilots. The glider model is DHV 2 certified.

Summit XC
Produced from 2008-2010.
Summit XC S
Small-sized model for lighter pilots. The glider model is DHV LTF 2 certified.
Summit XC SM
Small medium-sized model for mid-weight pilots. The glider model is DHV LTF 2 certified.
Summit XC M
Mid-sized model for medium-weight pilots. The glider model is DHV LTF 2 certified.
Summit XC L
Large-sized model for heavier pilots. The glider model is DHV LTF 2 certified.

Summit XC2
Produced from 2011-2014.
Summit XC2 S
Small-sized model for lighter pilots. The glider model is DHV LTF/EN C certified.
Summit XC2 SM
Small medium-sized model for mid-weight pilots. The glider model is DHV LTF/EN C certified.
Summit XC2 M
Mid-sized model for medium-weight pilots. The glider model is DHV LTF/EN C certified.
Summit XC2 L
Large-sized model for heavier pilots. The glider model is DHV LTF/EN C certified.

Summit XC4
Produced from 2015–present.
Summit XC4 S
Small-sized model for lighter pilots. The glider model is undergoing DHV EN B certification.
Summit XC4 S/M
Small medium-sized model for mid-weight pilots. The glider model is undergoing DHV EN B certification.
Summit XC4 M
Mid-sized model for medium-weight pilots. The glider model is undergoing DHV EN B certification.
Summit XC4 L
Large-sized model for heavier pilots. The glider model is undergoing DHV EN B certification.

Specifications (Summit M)

References

External links

Summit
Paragliders